Donald Kudangirana is a Zimbabwean professional rugby league footballer who last played for the Dewsbury Rams in the Kingstone Press Championship.

Kudangirana had previously spent time on loan at the Hemel Stags in Kingstone Press League 1.

References

External links
Sheffield Hallam Eagles profile

Living people
Zimbabwean rugby league players
Rugby league wingers
Dewsbury Rams players
Hemel Stags players
Year of birth missing (living people)